Acupalpus carus is a black coloured insect-eating ground beetle of the Acupalpus genus which can be found in Canada and the United States.

References

carus
Beetles described in 1863
Beetles of North America